The Cheng–Zhu school, is one of the major philosophical schools of Neo-Confucianism, based on the ideas of the Neo-Confucian philosophers Cheng Yi, Cheng Hao, and Zhu Xi. It is also referred to as the Rationalistic School.

Metaphysics 
Zhu Xi's formulation of the Neo-Confucian world view is as follows.

In contrast to Buddhists and Daoists, Neo-Confucians did not believe in an external world unconnected with the world of matter. In addition, Neo-Confucians in general rejected the idea of reincarnation and the associated idea of karma.

Human nature and rationality 
Human nature is originally good, the Neo-Confucians argued (following Mencius), but not pure unless action is taken to purify it. The imperative is then to purify one's .

Different Neo-Confucians had differing ideas for how to do so.

References

Neo-Confucianism
Rationalism
Song dynasty
Zhu Xi

History of Chinese philosophy